Lyudmila Borisovna Narusova (born 2 May 1951) is a Russian politician, a member of the Federation Council of Russia, representing Tuva. From 2010 to 2012, she represented Bryansk Oblast in the Federation Council of Russia.

Early life, education and early career
Narusova was born in Bryansk, Russian SFSR, Soviet Union, the daughter of a Russian mother and of Boris Narusovich, a Jewish Platoon Commander of the Red Army and a lieutenant of the Komsomol, who later was appointed the Director of the School for the Deaf in Bryansk. In 1969–1974, she studied history in Leningrad State University. Then, in 1977–1980, she studied history at the graduate school of the Institute of History of the Academy of Sciences of the Soviet Union and worked at Leningrad State University. In 1980, she married Anatoly Sobchak. After obtaining Ph.D. in History, she taught history at the Saint Petersburg Academy of Culture.

Political career
Narusova entered Russian politics when she was elected to the State Duma in 1995. She was a member of "Our Home – Russia" faction until 2006. Since 2000, Narusova became a host of TV-show "Freedom of speech" at St. Petersburg branch of RTR.

In October 2002, she was elected a member of the Federation Council of Russia from Tuva Republic. Since 2010, Narusova served as a senator from Bryansk Oblast, but she was dismissed by Nikolay Demin, a former governor of Bryansk Oblast. In 2016, she became a member of the Federation Council of Russia from Tuva Republic for a new term.

In 2013, Narusova was expelled from the Fair Russia party. However, she later claimed she had never formally been a member of a party.

Criticism of invasion of Ukraine
In response to 2022 Russian invasion of Ukraine, Narusova on 27 February stated in a television interview: "I do not identify myself with those representatives of the state that speak out in favor of the war. I think they themselves do not know what they are doing. They are following orders without thinking." She also stated that Russian soldiers in Ukraine lay "unburied; wild, stray dogs gnawing on bodies that in some cases cannot be identified because they are burned." On 4 March Narusova told the Federation Council, in livestreamed proceedings, of the heavy losses Russian forces were suffering in Ukraine. She claimed to know of a 100-strong Russian conscript company of whom "only four were left alive" when the unit was withdrawn.

Family

Narusova is the widow of Anatoly Sobchak (1937—2000), who was a prominent Russian politician, mentor and teacher of both Vladimir Putin and Dmitry Medvedev, and the mother of Ksenia Sobchak (born 1981), who is widely known in Russia as a presenter on Dom-2 and other TV shows.

Honours
Medal "In Commemoration of the 850th Anniversary of Moscow"
Medal "In Commemoration of the 300th Anniversary of Saint Petersburg"

References

External links

Official site of Anatoly Sobchak (Russian)

1951 births
20th-century Russian women politicians
21st-century Russian women politicians
Living people
Members of the Federation Council of Russia (after 2000)
Saint Petersburg State University alumni
Second convocation members of the State Duma (Russian Federation)
Our Home – Russia politicians
Russian activists against the 2022 Russian invasion of Ukraine
Russian people of Jewish descent
Russian television personalities
Spouses of politicians